FC Poltava was a Ukrainian football club based in Poltava in 2007–2018.

History
The club was created by the newly elected mayor of the Poltava city Andriy Matkovsky (2006-2010) who is the club's Honorary President and the main sponsor. FC Poltava entered the professional leagues for the 2007–08 season in the Druha Liha B without playing a single game at amateur level. The first coach of the main team was Oleksandr Omelchuk who previously coached FC Vorskla-2 Poltava. FC Poltava started the season trepidly but in the second half they improved a great deal.

The team's goal is to train players for the teams of the Premier League and First League. The club also has intentions to reestablish the forgotten Poltava derby that in the Soviet times took place between teams of Kolkhospnyk (today's Vorskla) and Lokomotyv. FC Poltava has an agreement of cooperation with the local Horpynka sports school. In summer of 2010 the club announced of its withdrawal from the professional football due to a biased attitude from the PFL of Ukraine, particularly its refereeing. After some talks with several state officials and from Ministry of sport a consensus was found. It was decided that the club would continue its participation in the Second League.

Home uniforms was dark green.

On 21 June 2018 it was announced that FC Poltava is dissolved.

Honours
Ukrainian First League
 Runners-up (1): 2017–18
Ukrainian Second League
 Winners (1): 2011–12
 Runners-up (2): 2008–09, 2010–11

List of head coaches
 2007–2009: Oleksandr Omelchuk
 2009–2010: Ivan Shariy (caretaker)
 2010–2010: Yuriy Malyhin
 2010–2013: Anatoliy Bezsmertnyi
 2013–2015: Ilya Blyznyuk
 2015: Oleh Fedorchuk
 2015–2016 Anatoliy Bezsmertnyi
 2016: Andriy Zavyalov (caretaker)
 2016–2017: Yuriy Yaroshenko
 2017: Volodymyr Prokopinenko
 2017–2018: Anatoliy Bezsmertnyi

League and cup history

{|class="wikitable"
|-bgcolor="#efefef"
! Season
! Div.
! Pos.
! Pl.
! W
! D
! L
! GS
! GA
! P
!Domestic Cup
!colspan=2|Europe
!Notes
|-bgcolor=PowderBlue
|align=center|2007–08
|align=center|3rd "B"
|align=center|11
|align=center|34
|align=center|11
|align=center|10
|align=center|13
|align=center|36
|align=center|51
|align=center|43
|align=center|Did not enter
|align=center|
|align=center|
|align=center|
|-bgcolor=PowderBlue
|align=center|2008–09
|align=center|3rd "B"
|align=center bgcolor=silver|2
|align=center|34
|align=center|21
|align=center|9
|align=center|4
|align=center|52
|align=center|23
|align=center|72
|align=center|1/32 finals
|align=center|
|align=center|
|align=center|
|-bgcolor=PowderBlue
|align=center|2009–10
|align=center|3rd "B"
|align=center bgcolor=tan|3
|align=center|26
|align=center|16
|align=center|6
|align=center|4
|align=center|34
|align=center|16
|align=center|54
|align=center|1/16 finals
|align=center|
|align=center|
|align=center|
|-bgcolor=PowderBlue
|align=center|2010–11
|align=center|3rd "B"
|align=center bgcolor=silver|2
|align=center|22
|align=center|15
|align=center|3
|align=center|4
|align=center|41
|align=center|24
|align=center|48
|align=center|1/8 finals
|align=center|
|align=center|
|align=center|
|-bgcolor=PowderBlue
|align=center|2011–12
|align=center|3rd "B"
|align=center bgcolor=gold|1
|align=center|26
|align=center|18
|align=center|5
|align=center|3
|align=center|50
|align=center|18
|align=center|59
|align=center|1/16 finals
|align=center|
|align=center|
|align=center bgcolor=lightgreen|Promoted
|-bgcolor=LightCyan
|align=center|2012–13
|align=center|2nd
|align=center|13
|align=center| 34 	
|align=center|11 	
|align=center|12 	
|align=center|11 	
|align=center|35 	
|align=center|35
|align=center|45
|align=center|1/32 finals
|align=center|
|align=center|
|align=center| 
|-bgcolor=LightCyan
|align=center|2013–14
|align=center|2nd
|align=center|4
|align=center|30
|align=center|14
|align=center|4
|align=center|12
|align=center|36
|align=center|34
|align=center|46
|align=center|1/16 finals
|align=center|
|align=center|
|align=center|
|-bgcolor=LightCyan
|align=center|2014–15
|align=center|2nd
|align=center|10
|align=center|30
|align=center|11
|align=center|9
|align=center|10
|align=center|29
|align=center|27
|align=center|42
|align=center|1/8 finals
|align=center|
|align=center|
|align=center|
|-bgcolor=LightCyan
|align=center|2015–16
|align=center|2nd
|align=center|10
|align=center|30 	
|align=center|10 	
|align=center|8 	
|align=center|12 	
|align=center|29 	
|align=center|32 	 	
|align=center|38
|align=center|1/32 finals
|align=center|
|align=center|
|align=center|
|-bgcolor=LightCyan
|align=center|2016–17
|align=center|2nd
|align=center|12
|align=center|34 	
|align=center|13 	
|align=center|4 	
|align=center|17 	
|align=center|33 	
|align=center|43 	
|align=center|40
|align=center|1/4 finals
|align=center|
|align=center|
|align=center|−3
|-bgcolor=LightCyan
|align=center|2017–18
|align=center|2nd
|align=center bgcolor=silver|2
|align=center|34 
|align=center|23  
|align=center|3  
|align=center|8  
|align=center|56
|align=center|26   	
|align=center|72
|align=center|1/32 finals
|align=center|
|align=center|
|align=center bgcolor=lightgreen|Promoted
|-
|align=center|2018–19
|align=center colspan=13 bgcolor=lightgrey|before the start of the season withdrew and dissolved
|}

Notes and references

External links
 FC Poltava Official page

 
Football clubs in Poltava
Defunct football clubs in Ukraine
Association football clubs established in 2007
Association football clubs disestablished in 2018
2007 establishments in Ukraine
2018 disestablishments in Ukraine